Events in the year 2002 in Turkey.

Incumbents
President: Ahmet Necdet Sezer
Prime Minister: Bülent Ecevit (until 18 November), Abdullah Gül (from 18 November)

Births
4 February – Erencan Yardımcı, football player

Deaths
25 March – Esmeray
30 August – Hüsnü A. Göksel
2 December – Mehmet Emin Toprak

References

 
Years of the 21st century in Turkey
2000s in Turkey
Turkey
Turkey
Turkey